The Niue Star is a weekly Niuean newspaper, founded in 1993. It is Niue's only newspaper. Its founder, owner, editor, journalist and photographer is Michael Jackson. The newspaper is distributed in Niue, New Zealand and Australia, and has a circulation of 800. It is a bilingual newspaper, published both in English and in Niuean.

History
The Niue Star was founded with the assistance of AESOPS, which provided Jackson with equipment including a computer, a digital camera and a printing press. It also provided Jackson with a journalism course. The latter had previously worked as publisher of the now-defunct government newspaper Tohi Tala Niue, but set up the private Niue Star as his own initiative.

The Star was originally printed in Alofi, until its main office and printing shop were destroyed by Cyclone Heta in 2004. It then moved to Auckland.

According to its editor, Michael Jackson,
"The Niue Star is the community newspaper. Now it's mainly information, village happenings, community happenings, family interest stories like hair cuttings and ear piercing. The good thing about it is that all our families in New Zealand and Australia are looking forward for the Niue Star to read how, you know, what goes on back home and to see these colourful photographs. So that's my market."

Jackson also reports on political news ("[I]f the government is, you know, not doing the right thing and the people want to know, then I will insist in reporting it."), and, through the Star, aims to "connect Niueans wherever they are". A large majority of Niueans live outside Niue itself, which, due to continuous emigration, has a population of barely 1000. Most Niuean expatriates live in New Zealand, where the Niue Star'' is distributed within the Niuean community.

References

External links
Niue Star

Companies of Niue
Newspapers established in 1993
Newspapers published in New Zealand
Newspapers published in Niue
Bilingual newspapers
1993 establishments in Niue